Red Banks is a census-designated place and unincorporated community located in Marshall County, Mississippi, United States. The community is the birthplace of Gus Cannon, an American blues musician who helped to popularize jug bands in the 1920s and 1930s. Cannon is best known for his 1929 song Walk Right In, that became a popular hit in 1963 when recorded by the folk music group, The Rooftop Singers.

It was first named as a CDP in the 2020 Census which listed a population of 215.

Demographics

2020 census

Note: the US Census treats Hispanic/Latino as an ethnic category. This table excludes Latinos from the racial categories and assigns them to a separate category. Hispanics/Latinos can be of any race.

Notes

Unincorporated communities in Marshall County, Mississippi
Unincorporated communities in Mississippi
Census-designated places in Marshall County, Mississippi